The Hilton Head International Piano Competition is a piano competition held annually since 1996 at Hilton Head Island, South Carolina's First Presbyterian Church.

Selected list of jurors

  Joseph Banowetz
  José Feghali
   Peter Frankl
   Kemal Gekić
  John Giordano
   Enrique Graf
  Ian Hobson
   Leslie Howard
  Jerome Lowenthal
  Dominique Merlet
  John O'Conor
  Piotr Paleczny
  Daniel Pollack
   Menahem Pressler
  Jerome Rose
  Ann Schein Carlyss
  Andre-Michel Schub
  Christopher Taylor
   Valerie Tryon
  Arie Vardi
  Mikhail Voskresensky
  Janice Weber

Prize winners

References 
  Hilton Head International Piano Competition

External links
 Hilton Head International Piano Competition official website

Piano competitions in the United States